Half Day or Halfday may refer to:

Half Day, Illinois, a former unincorporated town in Lake County 
Halfday Creek, a river in Kansas